Buddhism and Hinduism have common origins in the culture of Ancient India. Buddhism arose in the Gangetic plains of Eastern India in the 5th century BCE during the "second urbanisation" (600 BCE - 200 BCE). Hinduism developed as a fusion or synthesis of practices and ideas from the ancient Vedic religion and elements and deities from other local Indian traditions. This Hindu synthesis emerged after the Vedic period, between 500-200 BCE and c. 300 CE, in or after the period of the Second Urbanisation, and during the early classical period of Hinduism, when the Epics and the first Puranas were composed.

Both religions have many shared beliefs and practices, but also pronounced differences that have led to much debate. Both share belief in karma and rebirth (or reincarnation), they both accept the idea of spiritual liberation (moksha, nirvana) from the cycle of reincarnation and they both promote similar religious practices (such as dhyana, samadhi, mantra, and devotion). Both religions also share many deities (though their nature is understood differently), including Saraswati, Vishnu (Upulvan), Mahakala, Indra, Ganesh and Brahma.

However, Buddhism notably rejects fundamental Hindu doctrines such as atman (substantial self or soul), Brahman (a universal eternal source of everything) and the existence of a creator God (Ishvara). Instead, Buddhism teaches not-self (anatman) and dependent arising as fundamental metaphysical theories.

Origins

Buddhism
Historically, the roots of Buddhism lie in the religious thought of Iron Age India around the middle of the first millennium BCE. This was a period of great intellectual ferment and socio-cultural change known as the "Second urbanisation", marked by the growth of towns and trade, the composition of the Upanishads and the historical emergence of the Śramaṇa traditions.

New ideas developed both in the Vedic tradition in the form of the Upanishads, and outside of the Vedic tradition through the Śramaṇa movements. The term Śramaṇa refers to several Indian religious movements parallel to but separate from the historical Vedic religion, including Buddhism, Jainism and others such as Ājīvika.

Several Śramaṇa movements are known to have existed in India before the 6th century BCE (pre-Buddha, pre-Mahavira), and these influenced both the āstika and nāstika traditions of Indian philosophy. According to Martin Wilshire, the Śramaṇa tradition evolved in India over two phases, namely Paccekabuddha and Savaka phases, the former being the tradition of individual ascetic and the latter of disciples, and that Buddhism and Jainism ultimately emerged from these. Brahmanical and non-Brahmanical ascetic groups shared and used several similar ideas, but the Śramaṇa traditions also drew upon already established Brahmanical concepts and philosophical roots, states Wiltshire, to formulate their own doctrines. Brahmanical motifs can be found in the oldest Buddhist texts, using them to introduce and explain Buddhist ideas. For example, prior to Buddhist developments, the Brahmanical tradition internalised and variously reinterpreted the three Vedic sacrificial fires as concepts such as Truth, Rite, Tranquility or Restraint. Buddhist texts also refer to the three Vedic sacrificial fires, reinterpreting and explaining them as ethical conduct.

The Śramaṇa religions challenged and broke with the Brahmanic tradition on core assumptions such as Atman (soul, self), Brahman, the nature of afterlife, and they rejected the authority of the Vedas and Upanishads. Buddhism was one among several Indian religions that did so.

Hinduism

Scholars regard Hinduism as a fusion or synthesis of various Indian cultures and traditions.
Among its roots are the historical Vedic religion, itself already the product of "a composite of the Indo-Aryan and Harappan cultures and civilizations", which evolved into the Brahmanical religion and ideology of the Kuru Kingdom of Iron Age northern India; but also the Śramaṇa or renouncer traditions of northeast India, and mesolithic and neolithic cultures of India, such as the religions of the Indus Valley Civilisation, Dravidian traditions, and the local traditions and tribal religions.

This Hindu synthesis emerged after the Vedic period, between 500-200 BCE and c. 300 CE, in or after the period of the Second Urbanisation, and during the early classical period of Hinduism, when the Epics and the first Puranas were composed. This Brahmanical synthesis incorporated śramaṇic and Buddhist influences and the emerging bhakti tradition into the Brahmanical fold via the smriti literature. This synthesis emerged under the pressure of the success of Buddhism and Jainism. During the Gupta reign the first Puranas were written, which were used to disseminate "mainstream religious ideology amongst pre-literate and tribal groups undergoing acculturation." The resulting Puranic Hinduism differed markedly from the earlier Brahmanism of the Dharmasutras and the smritis. Hinduism co-existed for several centuries with Buddhism, to finally gain the upper hand at all levels in the 8th century.

Shared features and similarities

Shared terms and teachings 
Buddhism and Hinduism share numerous terms and ideas. Examples include: dharma, karma, samadhi, samsara, dhyana, jñana, klesha, nirodha, samskāra, brahmin, brahmacarya, nirvana.

Indian Buddhists and Hindus also used the Sanskrit language as a religious and scholarly language. Sanskrit terminology remains important for both Buddhists and Hindus.

The Buddha used numerous religious terms which are also used in Hinduism, though he often used them in different and novel ways. Many terms which Buddhism shares with Hinduism carry a different meaning in the Buddhist tradition. For example, in the Samaññaphala Sutta, the Buddha is depicted presenting a notion of the "three knowledges" (tevijja) – a term also used in the Vedic tradition to describe knowledge of the Vedas – as being not texts, but things that he had experienced. The true "three knowledges" are said to be constituted by the process of achieving enlightenment, which is what the Buddha is said to have achieved in the three watches of the night of his enlightenment.

Karma, rebirth, and samsara
Karma is a central part of Hindu and Buddhist teachings. Karma is a word meaning action or activity and often implies its subsequent results (also called karma-phala, "the fruits of action"). Karma theory is commonly applied to the ethical realm of cause and effect in both Buddhism and Hinduism. In Buddhism and in Hinduism, a person's words, thoughts and actions form the basis for good and bad karma. Good deeds (good karmas) lead to good karmic results (Sanskrit: karma-phala, the fruits of karma) which can include the circumstances of one's future reincarnation. Likewise, evil actions might result in negative karmic consequences.

Thus, the Indian idea of karma is also closely associated with the idea of reincarnation or rebirth. One's karmas in previous lives affect one's present existence, and one's actions in this life will lead to effects in the next life. Both Buddhism and Hinduism accept that living beings are constantly cycling through different bodies and realms of existence, in a repetitive process called saṃsāra (literally "the wandering").

Dharma

Dharma (Sanskrit, Devanagari: धर्म or Pāli Dhamma) is an Indic term common to all Indian religions. Dharma can mean nature, natural law, reality, teaching, religion or duty, and with respect to its significance for spirituality and religion might be considered the way of the higher truths. A Hindu appellation for Hinduism itself is Sanātana Dharma, which translates as "the eternal dharma." Similarly, Buddha Dharma is a common way that Buddhists refer to Buddhism.

In Hinduism, Dharma can refer generally to religious duty or universal order (similar to rta), and also mean social order, right conduct, or simply virtue. In Buddhism, Dharma can mean the true nature of things or the natural law that the Buddha discovered. It can also refer to the teachings of the Buddha, which explain and reveal this nature.

Asceticism and monasticism 
Both Buddhism and some forms of Hinduism emphasize the importance of monasticism. In Buddhism, the monastic sangha plays a central role in teaching and passing down the Buddha's Dharma. Monasticism is also seen as an ideal way of life for cultivating the qualities that lead to awakening. In certain sects of Hinduism, the life of the renouncer (sannyasa) is also very important.

Cosmology and deities 

Buddhist cosmology and Hindu cosmology share many similarities, Both cosmologies are cyclical and both accept that the universe goes through constant cycles of growth and destruction. Both traditions also accept that there are many different realms or worlds (lokas) other than the human realm. These include various hell realms and celestial deva realms.

Buddhism and Hinduism share some of the same deities, including:

 Saraswati (known as Benzaiten in Japan),
 Vishnu (known as Upulvan in Sri Lanka),
 Mahākāla (a form of Shiva in Hinduism) is seen as a form of Avalokiteśvara in Mahayana Buddhism
 Indra, Vedic-era Hindu storm god of the Heavens, who is also widely depicted in Buddhist scriptures
 Ganesh (more widely known as Ganapati in Buddhism)
 Brahma (seen as a protective figure in Buddhism, see: Brahma in Buddhism)
 Lakshmi (in Japanese Buddhism she is known as Kishijoten)
 Tara is an important Buddhist deity in Tibetan Buddhism. In Hinduism, Tara Devi is one of the ten Mahavidyas.

The Buddhist text Mahamayuri Tantra, written during 1–3rd centuries CE, mentions various deities (such as Maheshvara) throughout South Asia, and invokes them for the protection of the Buddhadharma. It also mentions a large number of Vedic rishis.

According to the biography of the Buddha, before taking his last birth on earth as Gautama, the Buddha was a Mahapurusha (great being) named Shvetaketu, dwelling in the Tushita heaven (home of the contented gods). After attaining enlightenment on earth, there is to be no more rebirth for the Buddha. Before leaving the Tushita realm to take birth on earth, he designated Maitreya to take his place there. Maitreya will come to earth as the next Buddha, instead of him coming back again. Krishna was a past life of Sariputra, a chief disciple of the Buddha.

Liberation
Both Buddhism and Hinduism teach a similar goal of liberation or spiritual enlightenment from the cycle of rebirths (samsara). Both religions accept that the escape from the cycle of rebirths or samsara is the highest goal of the spiritual life. In both religions, this liberation is considered the complete end of rebirth or reincarnation. In Hinduism, this liberation may be called moksha, nirvana, or kaivalya; and in Buddhism it may be called vimoksha (Pali: vimokha), nirvana (Pali: nibbana) or bodhi (awakening). Both Hinduism and Buddhism use the term Nirvana (or Nibbana in Pali language) for spiritual liberation, which literally means 'blowing out' or 'quenching'. The term is pre-Buddhist, but its etymology is not essentially conclusive for finding out its exact meaning as the highest goal of early Buddhism.

Both religions also venerate the liberated beings who have attain the goal of spiritual liberation. Buddhism calls liberated beings either arhats or Buddhas (awakened ones). In Hinduism, liberated beings are commonly called jivanmuktas, though the term nirvana is also used. The term "Buddha" is also used in some Hindu scriptures. In the Vayu Purana for example, the sage Daksha calls Lord Shiva a Buddha.

Similar practices

Ethics 
Both Hinduism and Buddhism promote similar ethical systems. The virtue of non-harming (ahimsa) is a key virtue in both Hindu ethics and Buddhist ethics. Other important shared ethical principles include non-attachment (vairagya) or renunciation (nekkhamma) and truthfulness (satya).

Yogic practice, Dhyana and Samadhi 

The practice of Yoga is intimately connected to the religious beliefs and practices of both Hinduism and Buddhism. There is a range of common terminology and common descriptions of the meditative states that are seen as the foundation of meditation practice in both Hindu Yoga and Buddhism. Many scholars have noted that the concepts of dhyana and samādhi - technical terms describing stages of meditative absorption – are common to meditative practices in both Hinduism and Buddhism. Most notable in this context is the relationship between the system of four Buddhist dhyana states (Pali: jhana) and the samprajnata samadhi states of Classical Yoga. Also, many (Tibetan) Vajrayana practices of the generation stage and completion stage work with the chakras, inner energy channels (nadis) and kundalini, called tummo in Tibetan.

Yoga scholar Stephen Cope argues that Buddhism and Hindu traditions like Patanjali's Yoga (a system which is very influential on modern Hinduism) are strikingly similar in numerous key ways, having shared a long period of interchange up to about 500 CE.

The following chart compares these two basic religious systems: 

The Yoga Sutras of Patanjali, written some time after 100 BCE, describe eight limbs of yoga, aiming at samadhi, the stilling of the mind and the recognition of purusha as one's true identity. In the Vajrayana Buddhism of Tibet the term "Yoga" is simply used to refer to any type of spiritual practice; from the various types of tantra (like Kriyayoga or Charyayoga) to 'Deity yoga' and 'guru yoga'. In the early translation phase of the Sutrayana and Tantrayana from India, China and other regions to Tibet, along with the practice lineages of sadhana, codified in the Nyingmapa canon, the most subtle 'conveyance' (Sanskrit: yana) is Adi Yoga (Sanskrit). A contemporary scholar with a focus on Tibetan Buddhism, Robert Thurman writes that Patanjali was influenced by the success of the Buddhist monastic system to formulate his own matrix for the version of thought he considered orthodox.

Devotion 
Both traditions also make use of devotional practice (bhakti). Devotion in Buddhism is mainly directed towards the Buddhas and bodhisattvas, but may also include some devas. Mindfulness of the Buddha is a widespread practice in all Buddhist traditions and includes chanting or reciting the names or mantras of Buddhas and bodhisattvas. The practice of remembering the devas (Pali: devanussati), which might include visualizing them and remembering their qualities, is taught in numerous Buddhist sutras of the Pali Canon and is part of the ten recollections.

In Hinduism, bhakti yoga is focused on God (Ishvara), whether understood as Vishnu, Shiva or Devi. This yoga includes listening to scripture, prayer, chanting, worship services (puja) and other practices.

Mantra

A mantra (मन्त्र) is a religious syllable or poem, typically from the Sanskrit and Pali language. Their use varies according to the school and philosophy associated with the mantra. They are primarily used as spiritual conduits, words or vibrations that instill one-pointed concentration in the devotee. Other purposes have included religious ceremonies to accumulate wealth, avoid danger, or eliminate enemies. Mantras existed in the historical Vedic religion, Zoroastrianism and the Shramanic traditions, and thus they remain important in Buddhism and Jainism as well as other faiths of Indian origin such as Sikhism.

Rituals
Mahayana and Vajrayana Buddhist traditions in East Asia and Tibet share several common rituals with Hinduism. Some examples include the homa ritual as well as prayers and food offerings for the ancestors and deceased (which was incorporated into the Ghost Festival in East Asian Buddhist traditions).

Similar symbolism 
 Mudra: This is a symbolic hand-gesture expressing an emotion. Images of the Buddha almost always depict him performing some mudra.
 Dharma Chakra: The Dharma Chakra, which appears on the national flag of India and the flag of the Thai royal family, is a Buddhist symbol that is used by members of both religions.
 Tilak: Many Hindu devotees mark their heads with a tilak, which is interpreted as a third eye. A similar mark, the urna, is one of the characteristic physical characteristics of the Buddha.
 Swastikas are used in both traditions. It can be either clockwise or counter-clockwise and both are seen in Hinduism and Buddhism. The Buddha is sometimes depicted with a sauwastika on his chest or the palms of his hands.
 Mandalas
 Lotus flower

Differences 
There are several key doctrinal and practical differences between the two religions.

Founders
The founders of Hinduism and Buddhism are both unlike most major religions. Hinduism has no single founder. Modern Hinduism grew out of the overlapping beliefs of diverse Indian religious groups over centuries of history. Buddhism however does have a single historical founder, Siddhartha Gautama, a Śramaṇa who became the Buddha.

Scriptures 

Both traditions have their own canon of scripture and do not accept each other's scriptures as authoritative. Buddhism rejects the Vedas and other Hindu scripture as being authoritative. Instead, Buddhists generally accept the word of the Buddha (Buddhavacana) as being authoritative regarding religious matters. Buddhists also reject the idea that the Vedas are eternal divine scriptures (either as uncreated or as created by a God), which are common Hindu beliefs defended in the Vedanta and Mimamsa philosophies. As such, the Buddhism tradition ignores the very foundation of Hindu brahmanical religion, the sruti. 

Buddhist authors like Bhavaviveka and Saṅghabhadra argued that the Vedas were authored by ancient people who were spiritually and philosophically unqualified as well as being morally deficient. In his critique, Bhavaviveka actually draws on some passages found in the Hindu Samkhyakarika and in the work of Gaudapada, which holds that Vedic sacrifice is impure and of “mixed nature” (miśrībhāva). Bhavaviveka points to the presence of killing (found in various sacrifices), sexual promiscuity (in a Vedic ritual called Gosava) and use of alcohol (in a rite called Sautrāmaṇī) in the Vedas to argue that they were authored by evil people and compares them to the foreign scriptures of the "Magas" (i.e. the Persian Magi). Furthermore, in the ninth chapter of his Madhyamakahrdayakārikā (Verses on the Heart of the Middle Way), Bhavaviveka critiques the idea that bad karma can be removed through Vedic ritual, through devotion (bhakti) to the gods or by meditating on the gods and their mantras.

The Buddha is recorded as having criticized the Vedic Brahmanical religion in the Canki Sutta (Majjhima Nikaya 95) as a lineage which blindly passes on scriptures without having true knowledge of things:Suppose there were a file of blind men each in touch with the next: the first one does not see, the middle one does not see, and the last one does not see. So too, Bhāradvāja, in regard to their statement the brahmins seem to be like a file of blind men: the first one does not see, the middle one does not see, and the last one does not see. What do you think, Bhāradvāja, that being so, does not the faith of the brahmins turn out to be groundless?

The Indian Buddhist philosopher Dharmakīrti pithily expressed his disagreement with the religion of the Vedas as follows:Accepting the authority of the Vedas, believing in individual agency, hoping for merit from bathing, taking pride in caste, undertaking rites for the removal of evils: these are the five signs of stupidity, the destruction of intelligence.Meanwhile, most Hindus see the Vedas as divinely revealed scriptures, either authorless and eternal or as created by Ishvara. Many Hindus also hold the Vedas to be a key scriptural authority (Śāstra pramāṇam). In Hinduism, religious philosophies are often classified either as astika (orthodox) or nastika (unorthodox), that is, philosophies that either affirm or reject the authorities of the Vedas. According to this tradition, Buddhism is a nastika school.

Due to the Buddhist rejection of the Vedas (and the Vedic varṇāśrama - 'caste and life stage' teaching), many Hindu sources see Buddhists as heretics (pāṣaṇḍa/pākhaṇḍa) and a sign of the dark age, the Kali Yuga. For example, the Bhāgavata Purāṇa, an extremely influential Hindu Puranic source, considers Buddhists (as well Jains) to be "pāṣaṇḍas" (heretics, impostors). 

Likewise, as noted by Klaus K. Klostermaier, the Viṣṇu Purāṇa, an ancient and authoritative Purana, "presents the Buddha as a heretic and a seducer of people, one of many forms of the māyā-moha (delusive power) of Viṣṇu and recommends complete shunning of Buddhists in order to prevent pollution and punishment."

Metaphysics

Karma 
According to Richard Gombrich, Karma in Buddhism carries a significantly different meaning than pre-Buddhist conceptions of karma. For Buddhists, karma is mainly a mental process which is founded on an individual's intention (cetanā). The Buddha equated karma with the psychological impulse or intent behind the action (whether that action is bodily, verbal or mental). Thus, in Buddhism, one's intention has an ethical force that can affect one in the future (in this life or the next).

Meanwhile, according to the most influential school of Hindu philosophy, the Vedanta school, the effects of karma (karma-phala, i.e. the "fruits" of karma) are controlled by God (Isvara). Vedanta argues that without God, one cannot account for the workings of karma.

Brahman 
The old Upanishads largely consider Brahma (masculine gender, Brahmā in the nominative case, henceforth "Brahmā") to be a personal god (deva), and Brahman (neuter gender, Brahma in the nominative case, henceforth "Brahman") to be the impersonal world principle. They do not strictly distinguish between the two, however. The old Upanishads ascribe these characteristics to Brahmā: first, he has light and luster as his marks; second, he is invisible; third, he is unknowable, and it is impossible to know his nature; fourth, he is omniscient. The old Upanishads ascribe these characteristics to Brahman as well.

In the Buddhist texts, there are many Brahmā devas. There they form a class of superhuman beings, and rebirth into the realm of Brahmās is possible by pursuing Buddhist practices.

In the Pāli scriptures, the neuter Brahman does not appear (though the word brahma is standardly used in compound words to mean "best", or "supreme"), however ideas are mentioned as held by various Brahmins in connection with Brahmā that match exactly with the concept of Brahman in the Upanishads. Brahmins who appear in the Tevijja-suttanta of the Digha Nikaya regard "union with Brahmā" as liberation, and earnestly seek it. In that text, Brahmins of the time are reported to assert: "Truly every Brahmin versed in the three Vedas has said thus: 'We shall expound the path for the sake of union with that which we do not know and do not see. This is the correct path. This path is the truth, and leads to liberation. If one practices it, he shall be able to enter into association with Brahmā." The early Upanishads frequently expound "association with Brahmā", and "that which we do not know and do not see" matches exactly with the early Upanishadic Brahman.

In the earliest Upanishad, the Brihadaranyaka Upanishad, the Absolute, which came to be referred to as Brahman, is referred to as "the imperishable". The Pāli scriptures present a "pernicious view" that is set up as an absolute principle corresponding to Brahman: "O Bhikkhus! At that time Baka, the Brahmā, produced the following pernicious view: 'It is permanent. It is eternal. It is always existent. It is independent existence. It has the dharma of non-perishing. Truly it is not born, does not become old, does not die, does not disappear, and is not born again. Furthermore, no liberation superior to it exists elsewhere." The principle expounded here corresponds to the concept of Brahman laid out in the Upanishads. According to this text the Buddha criticized this notion: "Truly the Baka Brahmā is covered with unwisdom."

Gautama Buddha confined himself to what is empirically given. This empiricism is based broadly on both ordinary sense experience and extrasensory perception enabled by high degrees of mental concentration.

Ātman 
Ātman is a Sanskrit word that means 'self'. A major departure from Hindu and Jain philosophy is the Buddhist rejection of a permanent, self-existent soul (Ātman) in favour of anicca or impermanence.

In Hindu philosophy, especially in the Vedanta school of Hinduism, Ātman is the first principle, the true self of an individual beyond identification with phenomena, the essence of an individual. Yajnavalkya (c. 9th century BCE), in the Brihadaranyaka Upanishad, uses the word to indicate that in which everything exists, which is of the highest value, which permeates everything, which is the essence of all, bliss and beyond description. While, older Upanishads such as the Brihadaranyaka, mention several times that the self is described as Neti neti or not this – not this,

Post Buddhist Upanishads, like the Maitri Upanishad, define Ātman as only the defiled individual self, rather than the universal self. Taittiriya Upanishad defines Ātman or the self as consisting of five sheaths (kosha): the bodily self consisting of the essence of food (annamaya kosha), the vital breath (pranamaya kosha), the mind or will (manomaya kosha), the intellect or capacity to know (vijnanamaya kosha) and bliss (anandamaya kosha). Knowledge or realization of the Ātman is seen as essential to attain salvation (liberation):

Schools of Indian philosophy, such as Advaita (non-dualism) see Ātman within each living entity as being fully identical with Brahman – the Principle, whereas other schools such as Dvaita (dualism) differentiate between the individual atma in living beings, and the Supreme atma (Paramatma) as being at least partially separate beings. Unlike Advaita, Samkhya holds blissfullness of Ātman as merely figurative. However, both Samkhya and Advaita consider the ego (asmita, ahamkara) rather than the Ātman to be the cause of pleasure and pain. Later Advaitic text Pañcadaśī classifies the degrees of Ātman under three headings: Gauna or secondary (anything other than the personality that an individual identifies with), Mithya or false (bodily personality) and Mukhya or primary (the real self).

The concept of Ātman was rejected by the Buddha. Terms like anatman (not-self) and shunyata (voidness) are at the core of all Buddhist traditions. The permanent transcendence of the belief in the separate existence of the self is integral to the enlightenment of an Arhat. The Buddha criticized conceiving theories even of a unitary soul or identity immanent in all things as unskillful. In fact, according to the Buddha's statement in Khandha Samyutta 47, all thoughts about self are necessarily, whether the thinker is aware of it or not, thoughts about the five aggregates or one of them.

Despite the rejection of Ātman by Buddhists there were similarities between certain concepts in Buddhism and Ātman. The Upanishadic "self" shares certain characteristics with nibbana; both are permanent, beyond suffering, and unconditioned. Buddhist mysticism is also of a different sort from that found in systems revolving around the concept of a "god" or "self":

However, the Buddha shunned any attempt to see the spiritual goal in terms of "self" because in his framework, the craving for a permanent self is the very thing that keeps a person in the round of uncontrollable rebirth, preventing him or her from attaining nibbana. At the time of the Buddha some philosophers and meditators posited a root: an abstract principle all things emanated from and that was immanent in all things. When asked about this, instead of following this pattern of thinking, the Buddha attacks it at its very root: the notion of a principle in the abstract, superimposed on experience. In contrast, a person in training should look for a different kind of "root" — the root of dukkha experienced in the present. According to one Buddhist scholar, theories of this sort have most often originated among meditators who label a particular meditative experience as the ultimate goal, and identify with it in a subtle way.

Adi Shankara in his works refuted the Buddhist arguments against Ātman. He suggested that a self-evident conscious agent would avoid infinite regress, since there would be no necessity to posit another agent who would know this. He further argued that a cognizer beyond cognition could be easily demonstrated from the diversity in self existence of the witness and the notion. Furthermore, Shankara thought that no doubts could be raised about the Self, for the act of doubting implies at the very least the existence of the doubter. Vidyaranya, another Advaita Vedantic philosopher, expresses this argument as:

Cosmic self 
The Buddha denies the existence of the cosmic self, as conceived in the Upanishadic tradition, in the Alagaddupama Sutta (M I 135–136). Possibly the most famous Upanishadic dictum is tat tvam asi, "thou art that." Transposed into first person, the Pali version is eso ‘ham asmi, "I am this." This is said in several suttas to be false. The full statement declared to be incorrect is "This is mine, I am this, this is my self/essence." This is often rejected as a wrong view. The Alagaduppama Sutta rejects this and other obvious echoes of surviving Upanishadic statements as well (these are not mentioned as such in the commentaries, and seem not to have been noticed until modern times). Moreover, the passage denies that one’s self is the same as the world and that one will become the world self at death.

The Buddha tells the monks that people worry about something that is non-existent externally (bahiddhaa asati) and non-existent internally (ajjhattam asati); he is referring respectively to the soul/essence of the world and of the individual. A similar rejection of "internal" self and "external" self occurs at AN II 212. Both are referring to the Upanishads. The most basic presupposition of early Brahminic cosmology is the identification of man and the cosmos (instances of this occur at TU II.1 and Mbh XII.195), and liberation for the yogin was thought to only occur at death, with the adept's union with brahman (as at Mbh XII.192.22). The Buddha's rejection of these theories is therefore one instance of the Buddha's attack on the whole enterprise of Upanishadic ontology.

Theology

Buddhism does not accept the Hindu theory of a creator deity (Ishwara). While Buddhism inherited some practices and ideas from the previous Indian yogic traditions, its understanding is different than that of Hindu teachings (such as those found in the Bhagavad Gita). This is because, in Buddhism, Nirvana is not attained through bhakti (devotion) to God nor is it attained through a yogic unity with Brahman/God. 

In the early Buddhist texts, the Buddha does not provide specific arguments against the existence of God, instead he focuses on the ethical issues that arise from this belief. The Buddha mostly ignored the idea of a God as being irrelevant to his teachings. However, he addresses the idea in a few passages. According to Narada Thera, the Buddha saw the idea of a creator God as problematic and as possibly leading to a kind of fatalism or ethical nihilism that leaves all ethical concerns to a God. In another passage, the Buddha argues that if a Supreme creator exists, the suffering experienced by certain beings would mean that this creator is evil. 

The Buddha did not deny the existence of the gods (devas) of the Vedic pantheon, but rather argued that these devas, who may be in a more exalted state than humans, are still nevertheless trapped in the same cycle of suffering as other beings and are not necessarily worthy of veneration and worship. According to Buddhism, the Hindu gods like Brahma and Indra do exist. However, these gods are considered to be mortal (even though they have very long lives) and thus as being subject to rebirth. Buddhist cosmology recognizes various levels and types of devas and of other Buddhist deities, but none of these gods is considered the creator of the world or of the human race.

Later Buddhist philosophers such as Nagarjuna, Vasubandhu, and Xuanzang did write more extensive critiques of the Hindu idea of God.

Vajrayana Buddhism contains the idea of the Adi-Buddha ("First Buddha"), which some have compared to God concepts from Vedanta. However, modern Tibetan Buddhist masters like the Dalai Lama and Namkhai Norbu have written that this Adi-Buddha concept is not a God but a symbol for the Dharmakaya or "basis" (ghzi) in Dzogchen thought.

Caste

In the early Buddhist texts, the Buddha critiques the Brahmanical religion and social system on certain key points.

The Buddha disagreed with the caste (jāti) distinctions made in the Brahmanical religion, by offering ordination to all regardless of caste. In regards to the social system (varna), although Buddha did not try to dismantle this system, he spoke out against Brahmin supremacism and the notion of any varna being superior or inferior to another. Thus, the Buddha also critiqued the idea that brahmins were somehow superior or inherently pure due to their bloodline. The Vasetthasutta argues that the main difference among humans are their actions and occupations, not their bloodline.

Furthermore, the Buddha holds that there is one universal moral law (Dharma) that is valid for everybody. Thus, Buddhism rejects the idea of caste duty (svadharma), the idea that every person is assigned a fixed duty or law based on the caste they are born into.

While the caste system constitutes an assumed background to the stories told in Buddhist scriptures, the sutras do not attempt to justify or explain the system. According to the Aggañña Sutta, all social classes or varnas arose naturally through sociological factors, they were not divinely ordained. In the Aggañña Sutta, Buddha argues that good and bad deeds are found in all castes and that moral purity comes from one's own actions, not one's birth. Because of this, all castes including untouchables were welcome in the Buddhist order and when someone joined, they renounced all caste affiliation.

The meaning of brahmin 
The Buddha defined the word "brahmin" as referring to a spiritually liberated person. This replaced a distinction based on birth with one based on spiritual attainment. The Buddha explains his use of the word brahmin in many places. In the Sutta Nipata (1.7, Vasala Sutta, verse 12), the Buddha states: "not by birth is one an outcast; not by birth is one a brahmin. By deed one becomes an outcast, by deed one becomes a brahmin." An entire chapter of the Dhammapada is devoted to showing how a true brahmin in the Buddha's use of the word is one who is of totally pure mind, namely, an arahant. Similarly, early Buddhist scriptures define purity as determined by one's state of mind, and refer to anyone who behaves unethically, of whatever caste, as "rotting within", or "a rubbish heap of impurity". A defining of feature of the Buddha's teachings is self-sufficiency, so much so as to render the brahminical priesthood entirely redundant, since no mediation between oneself and the devas are needed in Buddhism.

However, some Hindu texts like the Bhagavad Gita also define brahmin (and other varnas) as a status based on personal qualities and actions. The Gita also does not mention birth as a factor in determining these. In that regard, the chapter on brahmins in the Dhammapada may be regarded as being entirely in tune with the definition of a brahmin in Chapter 18 of the Bhagavad Gita. Both say that a "brahmin" is a person having certain qualities.

Religious practices

Early Buddhist texts are often critical of prevailing religious practices and social institutions. Therefore, the Buddhist tradition has always rejected the view that certain Vedic rituals are efficacious or good. It especially rejects animal sacrifice which is taught in the Vedas (such as the Vedic Horse Sacrifice). 

However, the Buddha did not reject all sacrifices. In the Aṅguttara Nikāya the Buddha states: “I do not praise all sacrifice, nor do I withhold praise from all sacrifice." 

In the Sutta Pitaka, the Buddha critiques certain Vedic sacrifices while praising non-violent action as follows:The horse sacrifice, human sacrifice, sammāpāsa, vājapeyya, niraggaḷa: the grand sacrifices, fraught with violence, do not bring great fruit. The great seers of right conduct do not attend sacrifice where goats, rams, cattle, and various creatures are slain. But when they regularly offer by family custom, sacrifices free from violence, no goats, sheep and cattle,  and various creatures are slain. That sacrifice of the great seers of right conduct attend. The wise person should offer this; this sacrifice is very fruitful. For one who makes such sacrifice, it is indeed better, never worse. Such a sacrifice is truly vast and deities too are pleased. Animal sacrifice in Hinduism is still practiced in some minority sects of Hinduism.

The Buddha also rejected other Vedic practices and rituals, such as ritual bathing in rivers. In the Vatthasutta (MN 7), the Buddha states that bathing in rivers "can’t cleanse a cruel and criminal person from their bad deeds."

The Samaññaphala Sutta is another early Buddhist text which addresses and critiques numerous practices that were performed by brahmin priests or other Indian contemplatives at the time of the Buddha. Some of these practices include owning luxurious furniture and furnishings, wearing scents, cosmetics, jewelry and extensive decorations, talking about kings, armies, matters of state and gossiping. The text also rejects numerous ways of making a living that the Buddha held was not proper for a true ascetic such as: fortunetelling and forecasting the future, predicting eclipses, predicting the weather or disease, accounting, composing poetry, calculating auspicious dates, collecting debts, using spells against people, worshiping the sun, acting as an oracle, demonology, protection spells, fertility spells, ceremonial bathing, offering sacrificial fires, and administering various medicines and surgery.

However, some of these practices which were commonly done by brahmins were eventually adopted by some Buddhists, giving rise to practices like Buddhist medicine, Buddhist magic, Buddhist poetry, Tibetan medicine, Tibetan astrology, weather-making and so on. Similarly, fire sacrifices (homa) were adopted by Vajrayana Buddhism in scriptures like the Mahavairocana sutra.

Meditation

Meditation was an aspect of the practice of brahmanical and sramana yogis in the centuries preceding the Buddha. The Buddha built upon these ideas and developed new ideas regarding mediation and how it leads to liberation. Perhaps one original idea developed by the Buddha was that meditation and ethics also needed to be coupled with a "religious insight" (prajñā).

Early Buddhist texts are probably the earliest describing meditation states and methods. Early Buddhist texts also describe meditative practices and states that existed before the Buddha, as well as those first developed within Buddhism. A common set of four meditative states called jhanas (dhyanas) are widely discussed in Buddhist sutras. These states of meditative absorption and deep focus are seen as the key defining elements in Buddhist "right samadhi" (samma samdhi), the last part of the noble eightfold path.

The first usage of the term samadhi is found in early Buddhist texts. Later Hindu texts like the Yoga sutras also use the term samadhi to mean a deeply focused state of mind. However, they also understand this as leading to knowledge of the self or purusha, while Buddhists see samadhi as leading to insight into impermanence and not-self instead.

While there is no convincing evidence for meditation in pre-Buddhist early Brahminic texts, Wynne argues that formless meditation originated in the Brahminic or Shramanic tradition, based on strong parallels between Upanishadic cosmological statements and the meditative goals of the two teachers of the Buddha as recorded in the early Buddhist texts. He mentions less likely possibilities as well. Having argued that the cosmological statements in the Upanishads also reflect a contemplative tradition, he argues that the Nasadiya Sukta contains evidence for a contemplative tradition, even as early as the late Rg Vedic period.

Two Upanishads written after the rise of Buddhism also contain full-fledged descriptions of yoga as a means to liberation.

Spiritual liberation 

Hindu theories of liberation are focused on a substantial unchanging self (atman) or on unity with God (Ishvara), while Buddhist rejects both an unchanging self and a God, arguing that even consciousness (vijñana) is in flux. In Hinduism, the ultimate goal is to realize the Self as the highest reality (Brahman or Ishvara) or to serve God in his eternal realm (such as Vishnu's Vaikuntha or Krishna's Goloka). In the Buddha's system by contrast, one must train the mind in meditation (dhyana) and gain insight (vipasyana) into the four noble truths and dependent arising.

Liberation for the Brahminic yogin was thought to be the permanent realization at death of a nondual universal consciousness (brahman) which is seen as blissful (ananda) and eternal (anantam). The Buddha rejected this view. Yet he was still influenced by Indian ideas of liberation and thus he adopted and gave new meaning to Vedic metaphors for liberation (like nirvana, "becoming cool", "going out"). The Buddha taught that brahmanical states of oneness do not offer a decisive and permanent end to suffering either during life or after death and he also argued against the metaphysical theories that were at their foundation. These theories were based on the Upanishadic idea that was a unity between the personal atman and the universal brahman. The Buddha, in contrast, argued that states of consciousness are caused and conditioned by a yogi's mental states and meditative techniques. Thus, for the Buddha, none of these conditioned states of yogic consciousness could be an eternal Self.

Nonduality
Both the Buddha's conception of the liberated person and the goal of early Brahminic yoga can be characterized as non-dual, but in different ways. The nondual goal in early Brahminism was conceived in ontological terms; the goal was that into which one merges after death. According to Wynne, liberation for the Buddha "... is nondual in another, more radical, sense. This is made clear in the dialogue with Upasiva, where the liberated sage is defined as someone who has passed beyond conceptual dualities. Concepts that might have some meaning in ordinary discourse, such as consciousness or the lack of it, existence and non-existence, etc., do not apply to the sage. For the Buddha, propositions are not applicable to the liberated person, because language and concepts (Sn 1076: vaadapathaa, dhammaa), as well as any sort of intellectual reckoning (sankhaa) do not apply to the liberated sage.

Conversion 
Since the Hindu scriptures are essentially silent on the issue of religious conversion, the issue of whether Hindus proselytize is open to interpretations.  Those who view Hinduism as an ethnicity more than as a religion tend to believe that to be a Hindu, one must be born a Hindu.  However, those who see Hinduism primarily as a philosophy, a set of beliefs, or a way of life generally believe that one can convert to Hinduism by incorporating Hindu beliefs into one's life and by considering oneself a Hindu. The Supreme Court of India has taken the latter view, holding that the question of whether a person is a Hindu should be determined by the person's belief system, not by their ethnic or racial heritage.

Buddhism spread throughout Asia via proselytism and conversion. Buddhist scriptures depict such conversions in the form of lay followers declaring their support for the Buddha and his teachings, or via ordination as a Buddhist monk. Buddhist identity has been broadly defined as one who "takes Refuge" in the Three Jewels: Buddha, Dharma, and Sangha, echoing a formula seen in Buddhist texts. In some communities, formal conversion rituals are observed. No specific ethnicity has typically been associated with Buddhism, and as it spread beyond its origin in India immigrant monastics were replaced with newly ordained members of the local ethnic or tribal group.

Interactions
Hinduism and Buddhism have engaged in inter-religious exchange and dialogue for over two thousand years.

Influence of Vedic religion on early Buddhism 
Early Buddhist scriptures do not mention schools of learning directly connected with the Upanishads. Though the earliest Upanishads had been completed by the Buddha's time, they are not cited in the early Buddhist texts as Upanishads or Vedanta. For the early Buddhists they were likely not thought of as having any outstanding significance in and of themselves, and as simply one section of the Vedas.

Certain Buddhist teachings appear to have been formulated in response to ideas presented in the early Upanishads — some cases concurring with them, and in other cases criticizing or re-interpreting them.

The influence of Upanishads, the earliest philosophical texts of Hindus, on Buddhism has been a subject of debate among scholars. While Radhakrishnan, Oldenberg and Neumann were convinced of Upanishadic influence on the Buddhist canon, Eliot and Thomas highlighted the points where Buddhism was opposed to Upanishads.

Buddhism may have been influenced by some Upanishadic ideas, it however discarded their orthodox tendencies. In Buddhist texts, the Buddha is presented as rejecting Upanishadic avenues to salvation as "pernicious views".  Later schools of Indian religious thought were influenced by this interpretation and novel ideas of the Buddhist tradition of beliefs.

According to early Buddhist scriptures, the Buddha learned the two formless attainments from two teachers, Alara Kalama and Uddaka Ramaputta respectively, prior to his enlightenment. It is most likely that they belonged to the Brahmanical tradition. However, he realized that the states that they taught did not lead to awakening and thus he left their communities

Furthermore, the early Buddhist texts mention ideas similar to those expounded in the early Upanishads, before controverting them and using them in different ways.

Religious borrowing and appropriation

Buddha in Hinduism 

Between 450 CE and the sixth century, Hindus came to see the Buddha as an avatar of Vishnu. The first account of this appears in the Vishnu Purana. The word Buddha is also mentioned in several of the Puranas, which are held by modern scholars to have been composed after the Buddha's time.

The Bhāgavata Purāṇa states that "when the Kali Age has begun, in order to delude the enemies of the gods, Visnu will be born as the Buddha." In the Bhagavata and Vishnu Puranas, the main purpose of this incarnation was to destroy certain demons who had managed to learn Vedic rites and aceticism. For this purpose, Vishnu descended as the Buddha and taught a heresy to the demons so that they would abandon the Vedas and asceticism and lose their power, allowing them to be destroyed. According to the Vishnu Purana, these demons also taught this heresy to others who became Buddhists and abandoned the true Dharma. This allowed the gods to kill them. Similarly, the Bhaviṣya Purāṇa states that during the first stage of the Kali Yuga, when Vishnu was born as Shakyamuni, "the path of the Vedas was destroyed and all men became Buddhists. Those who sought refuge with Vishnu were deluded."

In spite of the negative association of the Buddha avatar with demons and heresy, some Hindus in the post-Puranic period also came to accept the Buddha avatar's teaching as being a positive teaching. Thus, the Varaha Purana and the Matsya Purana associate the Buddha avatar with beauty. The Devibhagavata Purana states that Vishnu "became incarnate as the Buddha in order to stop the slaughter of animals and to destroy the sacrifices of the wicked." Likewise, the Vaishnava poet Jayadeva (12th century) states that Vishnu became Buddha out of compassion for animals and to end bloody sacrifices.

Helmuth von Glasenapp held that the Buddha avatar myths came from a desire in Hinduism to absorb Buddhism peacefully.

Hindu deities in Buddhism 

Through its history, Buddhism borrowed and integrated various Hindu deities (or the qualities of Hindu deities) into their tradition. Mahayana Buddhist texts like the Kāraṇḍavyūhasūtra consider Hindu deities such as Vishnu, Shiva, Brahma and Saraswati as being bodhisattvas as well as emanations of Avalokiteshvara. Similarly, the popular Nīlakaṇṭha Dhāraṇī is a Mahayana dhāraṇī said to have been recited by Avalokiteshvara which praises the names of Harihara (a composite of Shiva and Vishnu).

Other Hindu deities adopted into Buddhism include Hayagrīva and Ganesh. During the tantric age, the Buddhist Vajrayana tradition adopted fierce tantric deities like Mahakala and Bhairava.

Theravada Buddhism also adopted some Hindu deities, the most important of which is Upulvan (i.e. Vishnu), who is seen as a guardian of Sri Lanka and as a bodhisattva.

Debate 

Buddhist and Hindu philosophers often engaged in debate in ancient India. This was done in person and also in written texts.

Buddhist philosophers often criticized Hindu thinkers. Some of the most common targets for criticism were the theory of the atman and the theory of Ishvara (a creator God). Both views are criticized by Buddhist thinkers like Vasubandhu. The Buddhist philosopher Nagarjuna is known for his extensive critiques of Nyaya school of Hindu philosophy. The Buddhist Bhavaviveka outlined numerous Hindu philosophies in his Madhyamakahrdaya and attempted to refute them. 

In turn, Hindu theologians like Adi Śaṅkara, Kumārila Bhaṭṭa and various Nyaya school philosophers (like Vātsāyana) likewise critiqued Buddhist thought in their various works. Śaṅkara accuses the Buddha of being "a man given to make incoherent assertions" and "propound absurd doctrines."

According to Klostermaier: Kumārila Bhaṭṭa in his Śloka-vārttika, a thoroughly systematic work, attacked Buddhism methodically. It provoked the Buddhist scholar Śāntarakṣita to counterattack Hinduism in great detail in his magnum opus Tattva-saṅgraha. Quoting extensively from the Śloka-vārttika, Śāntarakṣita demolishes the Hindu positions with great ingenuity and a certain sense of humor. This polemical exchange between Hindus and Buddhists was continued on both sides for centuries. It became customary for Hindu scholars to refute rival Buddhist schools in their writings before expounding their own teachings.

Intellectual influences 
Both Hindu and Buddhist philosophers were influenced by each others works. Buddhist philosophers like Vasubandhu and Dignaga were influenced by the works of the Nyaya school to develop more sophisticated forms of Buddhist epistemology.

Various thinkers of the Advaita Vedanta school, like Gaudapada and Adi Shankara, were also influenced by Buddhist ideas of the Madhyamaka school. Furthermore, later Advaita philosophers like Śrīharṣa (11th century), and Citsukha (13th century) adopted and utilized many of the arguments of the Buddhist Nagarjuna to show the illusory nature of the world.

Some Hindu philosophers (like the Saiva Utpaladeva) were also influenced by the work of Buddhist epistemologists like Dignaga and Dharmakirti.

Co-existence and shared religious sites 

Many examples exist of temples and religious sites which are or were used by both faiths. These include the Swayambhunath, Bodh Gaya, Boudhanath, Muktinath, Mount Kailash, Ajanta Caves, Ellora Caves, Elephanta Caves, Budhanilkantha and Angkor Wat.

Royal support and religious competition 

Buddhism originated in India and rose to prominence in the Mauryan era through royal support. It started to decline after the Gupta era and virtually disappeared from the Indian subcontinent in the 11th century CE, except in some countries like Nepal. It has continued to exist outside of India and has become the major religion in several Asian countries.

In later years, there is significant evidence that both Buddhism and Hinduism were supported by Indian rulers, regardless of the rulers' own religious identities. Buddhist kings continued to revere Hindu deities and teachers and many Buddhist temples were built under the patronage of Hindu rulers. Kalidasa's work shows the ascension of Hinduism at the expense of Buddhism.

By the eighth century, Shiva and Vishnu had replaced Buddha in pujas of royalty.

Notable views

By Hindus 
According to Klostermaier, while "virtually all the later commentators of the Vedānta-sūtras include anti-Buddhist polemics in their works" and "anti-Buddhist polemic continued in Hindu scholarly literature and became a standard part of the Hindu scholastic curriculum" (even after the decline of Buddhism in India).

However, during the Modern Era, as Buddhism became appreciated by European scholars, Hindu scholars also began to address Buddhism with a more friendly attitude. Swami Vivekananda often described the Buddha in positive terms, and also visited Bodh Gaya several times. However, he also sometimes expressed an ambivalent attitute towards Buddhism. Vivekananda wrote that "Hinduism cannot live without Buddhism and Buddhism not without Hinduism. . . . The Buddhists cannot stay without the brain and philosophy of the Brahmins, nor the Brahmins without the heart of the Buddhists. . . . Let us then join the wonderful intellect of the Brahmin with the heart, the noble soul, the wonderful humanizing power of the Great Master." However, he also wrote that "in spite of its wonderful moral strength, Buddhism was extremely icono- clastic and much of its force being spent in merely negative attempts, it had to die out in the land of its birth and what remained of it became full of superstitions and ceremonials, a hundred times cruder than those it was intended to suppress."

Other famous Hindu figures saw the Buddha as a great Hindu that greatly influenced Hinduism. Gandhi called the Buddha "a Hindu of Hindus" that "was saturated with the best that was in Hinduism" and "gave life to some of the teachings that were buried in the Vedas and which were overgrown with weeds". Gandhi also said:It is my deliberate opinion that the essential part of the teachings of the Buddha now forms an integral part of Hinduism. It is impossible for Hindu India today to retrace her steps and go behind the great reformation that Gautama effected in Hinduism. . . . What Hinduism did not assimilate of what passes as Buddhism today was not an essential part of the Buddha’s life and his teachings.Sarvepalli Radhakrishnan has claimed that the Buddha did not look upon himself as an innovator, but only a restorer of the way of the Upanishads. However, there is no evidence that the Buddha accepted the Upanishads.

Steven Collins sees such Hindu claims regarding Buddhism as part of a modernist effort to show that Hinduism is unique in its universalism regarding world religions.

Other modern Hindus, like Vir Savarkar, criticize Buddhism on nationalist grounds. Savarkar saw Buddhism as the cause for India's downfall, since it spread the doctrine of ahimsa (nonviolence) among the warrior class and deprived India of its warriors, which allowed the Huns and other invaders to conquer India.

Buddhists 
Ancient Buddhists philosophers like Dharmakirti have historically been staunch critics of Hindu belief and practice. Perhaps the most vehement modern Buddhist critic of Hinduism was the Indian jurist Bhimrao Ramji Ambedkar. Ambedkar blamed the Hindu caste ideology found in Hindu śāstras like the Manusmṛti for the marginalized state of the Indian Dalits. Because of his he renounced Hinduism, converted to Buddhism and convinced many Dalits to follow suit, launching the Dalit Buddhist movement.

However, other Buddhists have emphasized the similarities and harmony between Buddhism and Hinduism. The 14th Dalai Lama, in his address to the 1st World Hindu Congress (2014), said that Buddhism and Hinduism are like spiritual brothers which share teachings on compassion, self-discipline, ethics (sila), concentration (samatha) and wisdom (prajña) and who mainly differ in their views of atman and anatman. The Dalai Lama also spoke on how the Buddhist and Hindu tantras are quite similar.

The Dalai Lama has promoted harmony and dialogue between Hinduism and Buddhism and he has participated in Hindu rituals and prayers. The Dalai Lama has also spoken about how Buddhists and Hindus, though they differ in their belief in a creator God, have also learned much from each other through intellectual contact and debate and that this way of dialogue between different religions is part of the greatness of India.

See also
 Brahma (Buddhism)
 Buddha as an Avatar of Vishnu
 Buddhism and Eastern religions
 Buddhism and Jainism
 Creator in Buddhism
 Index of Buddhism-related articles
 Jambudvipa
 Mindful yoga

Notes

References

Sources

External links

 Hindu and Buddhist gods
 Gandhi and Lord Buddha
 Enlightenment in Buddhism and Advaita Vedanta: Are Nirvana and Moksha the Same? by David Loy, National Univ. of Singapore.
 Buddhism, the Fulfilment of Hinduism
 Enlightenment: Buddhism Vis-à-Vis Hinduism by Acharya Mahayogi Sridhar Rana

 
Hinduism and other religions
Buddhism in India